The women's 500 metre time trial in Cycling at the 2000 Summer Olympics was a time trial race in which each of the seventeen cyclists attempted to set the fastest time for two laps (500 metre) of the track. The race was held on Saturday, 16 September at the Dunc Gray Velodrome.

Medalists

Records
World and Olympics records before the games were held. This was a new event, so there was no previous Olympic record.

Results
 DNS denotes did not start.
 DNF denotes did not finish.
 DQ denotes disqualification.
 NR denotes national record.
 OR denotes Olympic record.
 WR denotes world record.
 PB denotes personal best.
 SB denotes season best.

References

External links
Official Olympic Report

M
Cycling at the Summer Olympics – Women's track time trial
Track cycling at the 2000 Summer Olympics
Olymp
Women's events at the 2000 Summer Olympics